Robin Bengtsson (born 27 April 1990) is a Swedish singer who took part in Swedish Idol 2008. He represented Sweden in the Eurovision Song Contest 2017 in Kyiv, Ukraine with the song "I Can't Go On" finishing in 5th place.

Career
Bengtsson was born in Svenljunga. He finished third behind winner Kevin Borg and runner-up Alice Svensson in Idol 2008. In mid-2009, he was signed by Merion Music label releasing the single "Another Lover's Gone". Bengtsson was also a guest of Katrin Zytomierska's programs Idol 2008: Eftersnack and ZTV program Sexuellt.

In 2010, Bengtsson took part in the charity song "Wake Up World" for "Hjälp Haiti" with Karl Martindahl and Daniel "The Moniker" Karlsson and also performed the song "Long Long Night" with Kim Fransson (known from the TV reality program Made in Sweden. In 2010, Robin Bengtsson participated in the Swedish/Scandinavian version of Wipeout, reaching the final round and finishing second. He participated in Melodifestivalen 2016 with the song "Constellation Prize" and placed fifth.

Bengtsson came back in Melodifestivalen 2017 with the song "I Can't Go On" and won the competition. He represented Sweden in the Eurovision Song Contest 2017 in Kyiv. He performed in the first semi-final on 9 May, and qualified for the final. In the final, he placed fifth.

He participated as a celebrity dancer in Let's Dance 2019, which was broadcast on TV4. Bengtsson's partner in the competition was Sigrid Bernson. The pair placed fifth overall.

Bengtsson took part in Melodifestivalen 2020 with the song "Take a Chance". He participated in the first semi-final of the competition, which took place in Linköping on 1 February. Bengtsson qualified directly for the final in Stockholm, which took place on 7 March. He finished in eighth place, scoring a total of 63 points.

He returned to Melodifestivalen in 2022 with the song "Innocent Love". He came second in the first round on 5 February 2022, qualifying directly to the final. At the final on 12 March 2022, he finished in eleventh place with 34 points. The song went to #10 on the Swedish charts.

Discography

References

External links

Robin Bengtsson MySpace
Robin Bengtsson Twitter
Robin Bengtsson page on LastFM

1990 births
Living people
Eurovision Song Contest entrants for Sweden
Eurovision Song Contest entrants of 2017
People from Svenljunga Municipality
Idol (Swedish TV series) participants
Melodifestivalen winners
21st-century Swedish singers
21st-century Swedish male singers
Melodifestivalen contestants of 2022
Melodifestivalen contestants of 2020
Melodifestivalen contestants of 2017
Melodifestivalen contestants of 2016